Saul Ascher (6 February 1767 in Berlin – 8 December 1822 in Berlin) was a German writer, translator and bookseller.

Life 

Saul Ascher (born Saul ben Anschel Jaff), was the first child of Deiche Aaron (c. 1744 Frankfurt – 1820 Berlin) and bank broker Anschel Jaffe (1745 Berlin – 1812 Berlin). In 1785, he attended high school in Landsberg an der Warthe (now Gorzów Wielkopolski). Ascher married Rachel Spanier on 6 June 1789 in Hanover. Spanier was the daughter of Nathan Spanier, the head of the Ravensberg Jewish community. On 6 October 1795, their only child, a daughter Wilhelmine, was born. On 6 April 1810, Ascher was arrested in Berlin, but was released on April 25 due to political pressure. On 6 October, he was awarded a doctoral degree in absentia from the University of Halle. In 1812, the year his father died, Ascher received his letter of citizenship. Ascher joined the Jewish reform-oriented Gesellschaft der Freunde (Society of Friends) in 1816. At the book-burning at the Wartburg festival on 18 October 1817, Ascher's work "Die Germanomanie" ("The German Mania") was burned.  Ascher became ill in October 1822, and on 8 December 1822 he died of "exhaustion."

Activity 

Ascher met and befriended Heinrich Zschokke in 1789. He also became friends with Solomon Maimon, Johann Friedrich Cotta and Marx's teacher Eduard Gans. Throughout his life, Ascher was rejected as a Jewish theorist and writer. Leopold Zunz remarked in 1818 that Ascher was an "enemy of all fanaticism, against the Deutschtümler ("Germanomaniac")" and that "his moral character isn't appreciated".

Ascher was a prolific writer. His work can be divided into three different areas: as author, translator, and editor/publisher.

Early on, Ascher worked as a publisher. His editorial work, as well as his authored works, bore various pseudonyms.

Ascher was a member and correspondent for various magazines, including the Berlin Monatsschrift, Berlin Archive of Time and Taste, Eunomia, Literary Newspaper Hall, Morning Paper for the Educated Classes of Cotta, Miscellany for New World Client by Zschokke, Journal de l'Empire.

Ascher founded and distributed at least two magazines himself. In 1810, a politically difficult year for Ascher, he founded the "Spirit of the World and Times", which was published until 1811 in six issues.

Teaching 
In his first publication, "Bemerkungen über die bürgerliche Verbesserung der Juden" ("Remarks on the Civil Improvement of the Jews"), Ascher noted:
 "Repression creates despondency of the spirit, contempt suppresses every germ of morality and education, tracking every germ of morality. No nation is more persecuted and despised than the Jewish."

Unlike other Jewish writers, Ascher was against Jews being forced to military service as this would only involve Jews of limited means, and not the upper classes. In 1799, his work "Ideen zur natürlichen Geschichte der politischen Revolutionen" ("Ideas on the natural history of political revolutions) was banned.

Legacy 

In his "Harz Journey", Heinrich Heine describes Ascher as a "doctor of reason" and has him appear after his death as a ghost seeking to prove the non-existence of ghosts with the help of the teachings of Kant's. . However, at the same time, Heine also stated that Ascher had influenced him in his own development. 

Ascher's disputes with Heinrich von Kleist were depicted falsly and opinionated by literary historian (and school teacher) Reinhold Steig in his book on Kleists Berlin struggles; "Heinrich von Kleist's Berliner Kämpfe", published Stuttgart, 1901. 

In 1977,  was the first to depict Ascher in detail in an essay, based on an 1928 dissertation by Fritz Pinkuss (on Moses Mendelson). 

The famous Stalinist Playwright from the GDR, Peter Hacks has also worked towards a political evaluation and revaluation of Ascher. He published two essays (in 1989 and 1990), which were later combined under the title Ascher gegen Jahn (Ascher against Jahn). 

Ascher plays an important role as a counter-figure to Clemens Brentano and Achim von Arnim in recent research on the relationship between Romanticism and anti-Semitism (see Puschner's study "Literature"). 

In an two-part essay, "The Falcon", André Thiele, last published in his collection "A World in Ruins" (2008), has presented preliminary work for a comprehensive biography of Ascher, as well as a bibliography of his works, which lists many more (ca. 50%) titles than were previously known.

In 2010, a single-volume selection of Saul Ascher's work was published by Böhlau Verlag, Bonn, and a year later the first volume of a comprehensive edition was published by André Thiele, Mainz.

Ascher's negative evaluation of Kantian rationalism—especially in its formulation by Fichte—as a "science of hating Judaism", has been credited by historian David Nirenberg as foresight into the development of a pseudo-science of Antisemitism that translated the Christian dialectic of supersession into the discourse of critical reason.

Works 

 Leviathan oder über Religion in Rücksicht des Judentums (Leviathan or religion in respect of Judaism) (1792)
 Eisenmenger der Zweite (Eisenmenger the Second) (1794)
 Philosophische Skizzen zur natürlichen Geschichte des Ursprungs, Fortschritts und Verfalls der gesellschaftlichen Verfassungen (Philosophical sketches of Natural History of the Origin, Progress and Decline of Social Constitutions) (1801)
 Orientalische Gemälde (Oriental Paintings) (1802)
 Ideen zur natürlichen Geschichte der politischen Revolutionen (Ideas for the Natural History of Political Revolutions) (1802)
 Kabinett Berlinischer Karaktere (Berlin Cabinet Character) (1808)
 Napoleon oder über den Fortschritt der Regierung (Napoleon or the Progress of the Government) (1808)
 Rousseau und sein Sohn (Rousseau and His Son) (1809)
 Historisch-romantische Gruppen (Historic-Romantic Groups) (1809)
 Romane, Erzählungen und Märchen (Novels, Short Stories and Tales) (2 Bde, erschienen 1810)
 Bagatellen aus dem Gebiete der Poesie, Kritik und Laune (Bagatelles of the Areas of Poetry, Criticism and Humor) (2 Bde, erschienen 1810–1811)
 Die Entthronung Alfonsos, Königs von Portugal (The Dethronement of Alfonso, King of Portugal) (1811)
 Die Germanomanie (The Germano Mania) (1815) online
 Idee einer Preßfreiheit und Censurordnung (Idea of Freedom of the Press and Censorship Regulation) (1818)
 Die Wartburgsfeier (The Wartburg Celebration) (1818)
 Ansicht von dem künftigen Schicksal des Christenthums (View of the Future Fate of Christianity) (1819)

Translations

 Henri Grégoire, Die Neger. Ein Beitrag zur Staats- und Menschenkunde. (1809)
 Auguste Lambert, Praxède oder der französische Werther. (1809)
 Charles Ganilh, Untersuchungen über die Systeme der politischen Ökonomie. (1811, anonym)
 Auguste Lambert, Schwärmereien der Liebe. (1816)
 Bernard v. Mandeville, Fabel von den Bienen. (1818, kommentiert)

Published post-mortem
 Ideen zur natürlichen Geschichte der Revolutionen, Kronberg/Ts. 1975
 4 Flugschriften, Berlin und Weimar 1990
 Ausgewählte Werke. Hrsg. Renate Best, Köln 2010,  (umfasst vier Texte)
 Werkausgabe. Theoretische Schriften, Band 1: Flugschriften, Hrsg. , Mainz 2010,  (umfasst sieben Essays)

Literature 

 Fritz Pinkuss: "Saul Ascher, ein Theoretiker der Judenemanzipation aus der Generation nach Moses Mendelssohn", in: Zeitschrift für die Geschichte der Juden in Deutschland VI (1936), S. 28–32.
 Walter Grab: "Saul Ascher. Ein jüdisch-deutscher Spätaufklärer zwischen Revolution und Restauration", in: Derselbe: Ein Volk muss seine Freiheit selbst erobern. Zur Geschichte der deutschen Jakobiner, Frankfurt 1984, S. 461–494.
 Peter Hacks: Ascher gegen Jahn. Ein Freiheitskampf, Berlin: Aufbau 1991.
 Christoph Schulte: Die jüdische Aufklärung: Philosophie, Religion, Geschichte,  C.H. Beck, 2002, .
 André Thiele: "Der Falke", in: Derselbe: Eine Welt in Scherben, Mainz 2008, S. 39–64.
 Marco Puschner: Antisemitismus im Kontext der politischen Romantik. Konstruktionen des "Deutschen" und des "Jüdischen" bei Arnim, Brentano und Saul Ascher, Tübingen: Niemeyer, 2008 (Conditio Judaica; 72).

References

External links 
 
 
 
 Fundstellen von / über Saul Ascher bei Google-Books, nur Volltexte
 Die 2010 gegründete Saul Ascher Seite

1767 births
1822 deaths
Jewish philosophers
Jewish German writers
German non-fiction writers
German male non-fiction writers